Luis David Martínez and Felipe Meligeni Alves were the defending champions but only Martínez chose to defend his title, partnering Roberto Quiroz. Martínez lost in the first round to Jesper de Jong and Bart Stevens.

De Jong and Stevens won the title after defeating Diego Hidalgo and Cristian Rodríguez 7–5, 6–2 in the final.

Seeds

Draw

References

External links
 Main draw

Challenger Ciudad de Guayaquil - Doubles
2021 Doubles